MV Abegweit was an icebreaking railway, vehicle, and passenger ferry which operated across the Abegweit Passage of Northumberland Strait, connecting Port Borden to Cape Tormentine between 1947 and 1982.

The word Abegweit is derived from the Mi'kmaq word for Prince Edward Island, Epekwit'k, meaning "cradled (or cradle) on the waves."

Design and construction

The first Abegweit was laid down as hull 144 in November 1944 and was launched in 1946 at the Marine Industries Limited shipyard in Sorel, Quebec.  Her designers were the famous Montreal design firm of German & Milne.  Her owners were Canadian National Railways (CNR), operator of the Borden–Cape Tormentine service from 1918 to 1977.

This vessel was the most powerful icebreaker in the world at the time of her commissioning on June 28, 1947, and was reportedly the heaviest vessel ever constructed in Canada as well.  Her patron at the time of commissioning was Katherine Francis Bovyer, wife of Prince Edward Island premier J. Walter Jones.  She entered service on August 14, 1947 and earned the hearts of Islanders who affectionately called her the "Abby".

She measured 372 feet in length and displaced 7,000 tons.  Her eight main engines generated 13,500 brake horsepower (10 MW) and drove propellers at both bow and stern.  She could carry 950 passengers and 60 cars (or one complete passenger train of 16 railway cars).

Service
The growth of vehicle and rail traffic by the 1950s soon made her obsolete, and subsequent vessels introduced in the 1960s and 1970s could carry more vehicles and rail traffic and could load and unload with greater speed.

Disposal and sale
The replacement for Abegweit was a vessel that was laid down as MV Straitway; however, while under construction CN Marine decided to name this new vessel Abegweit.  To accommodate this change, the original Abegweit was renamed Abby in fall 1982 and she maintained this name through the end of her ferry service.  After finishing service on the Borden–Cape Tormentine route, the Abby was moved to Pictou, Nova Scotia and placed for sale during the winter of 1982–1983.

During the winter of 1982–1983, while the new Abegweit was in service between Borden and Cape Tormentine, the old Abby was docked at Pictou, Nova Scotia and advertised for sale by CN Marine.  She was purchased by the Columbia Yacht Club in Chicago, Illinois. Chicago city ordinances barred the club from constructing a clubhouse on the waterfront, so the club decided to purchase the Abby and permanently moor her at their facility.

Abby left the Northumberland Strait for good in April, 1983 and remains in "service" in Chicago. A curious phenomenon arising out of CN Marine's name-switch operation is that many in the general public assume the new vessel's name was Abegweit II — this is not the case as she was officially registered as Abegweit.

Columbia Yacht Club
Abegweit was purchased by the Columbia Yacht Club in 1983 and moved to Chicago that spring. In 1986, she appeared in an action sequence in the film, Running Scared. She continues to serve as club house for the CYC. The ship had new hull paint applied in 2010, preserving the traditional color scheme.

See also
 CN Marine
 MV Abegweit (1982)

External links
 Columbia Yacht Club
 The Island Register.com - P.E.I.'s Coastal Vessels and Ferries

Ferries of Prince Edward Island
Ferries of New Brunswick
Icebreakers of Canada
CN Marine
Ships built in Quebec
1946 ships
Transport in Prince County, Prince Edward Island